Polina Kudermetova (Polina Eduardovna Kudermetova, born 4 June 2003) is a Russian professional tennis player. She has been ranked as high as world No. 166 in singles by the Women's Tennis Association, achieved on 30 January 2023, and No. 363 in doubles, achieved January 2023.

Career
At the 2023 Australian Open, Kudermetova  qualified for her first Grand Slam main draw on her qualifying debut by conquering compatriot Anastasia Gasanova, Katie Boulter, and Asia Muhammad in the final qualifying round. She lost to local wildcard Olivia Gadecki in the first round.

Personal life
She is the younger sister of professional tennis player and current world No. 9 Veronika Kudermetova, and daughter of Russian national ice hockey champion Eduard Kudermetov.

Grand Slam performance timeline

Singles

ITF Circuit finals

Singles: 8 (7 titles, 1 runner-up)

Doubles: 3 (3 runner-ups)

Notes

References

External links
 
 

2003 births
Living people
Sportspeople from Kazan
Russian female tennis players
Volga Tatars
Tatar sportspeople
Tatar people of Russia